In algebraic topology, a symmetric spectrum X is a spectrum of pointed simplicial sets that comes with an action of the symmetric group  on  such that the composition of structure maps

A morphism between symmetric spectra is a morphism of spectra that is equivariant with respect to the actions of symmetric groups.

The technical advantage of the category  of symmetric spectra is that it has a closed symmetric monoidal structure (with respect to smash product). It is also a simplicial model category. The possibility of this definition of "ring spectrum" was one of motivations behind the category.

A similar technical goal is also achieved by May's theory of S-modules, a competing theory.

References 

Introduction to symmetric spectra I
M. Hovey, B. Shipley, and J. Smith, “Symmetric spectra”, Journal of the AMS 13 (1999), no. 1, 149 – 208.

Algebraic topology
Simplicial sets
Symmetry